Georges Jean André Calmon (26 May 1910 – 25 October 1989)  was a French equestrian. He competed in two events at the 1956 Summer Olympics.

References

External links
 

1910 births
1989 deaths
French male equestrians
Olympic equestrians of France
Equestrians at the 1956 Summer Olympics